The Ruisseau du Lac au Lard stream is a tributary of the west bank of the Jeannotte River, flowing in the western hydrographic slope of the Batiscan River, in the territory of the city of La Tuque, in the administrative region of Mauricie, in Quebec, in Canada. This river crosses the zec de la Bessonne.

This hydrographic slope is served by the forest road R040, a bridge spanning the Lac au Lard stream, near its mouth.

Since the mid-19th century, forestry has been the predominant activity of the Lac au Lard stream watershed; recreational activities, second.

The surface of the Lac au Lard stream (except the rapids areas) is generally frozen from the beginning of December to the end of March, however the safe circulation on the ice is generally made from the end of December to the beginning of March. The water level of the river varies with the seasons and the precipitation.

Geography 
The stream of the Rivière au Lard rises at the mouth of lac au Lard. This forest lake is mainly fed to the northwest by the discharge of a set of lakes including Lac de la Grosse Roche and by the Doucet River (coming from the south).

The mouth of this lake is located  North-West of the mouth of the confluence of the Jeannotte River with the Batiscan river.

There are no tributaries.

The Lac au Lard stream flows on the west bank of the Jeannotte river course. This confluence is located at:
  north-west of the confluence of the Jeannotte and Batiscan rivers;
  south-east of Petit lac Wayagamac;
  South of the center of the village of Lac-Édouard;
  East of downtown La Tuque.

Toponymy 
The toponym "Ruisseau du Lac au Lard" was formalized on December 5, 1968, at the Commission de toponymie du Québec.

See also 

 List of lakes of Canada

References 

La Tuque, Quebec
Rivers of Mauricie